Rhys Joshua McClenaghan  (born 21 July 1999) is a Northern Irish artistic gymnast competing internationally for both Northern Ireland and Ireland. He is the 2022 world champion on pommel horse, the first Irish artistic gymnast ever to win world championship gold. He was previously European and Commonwealth Games champion on the same apparatus.

In 2019, he became the first Irish gymnast to qualify to a world championships final and to also win a medal, taking bronze on pommel horse. In addition to his world medal, McClenaghan is the first Irish gymnast to compete in a European final and also the first to win a European medal.

He also competed for Northern Ireland at the 2018 Commonwealth Games, winning the gold medal on the pommel horse. He followed this by winning the 2018 European Championships, pipping the reigning Olympic and two-time world champion, Max Whitlock on both occasions.

Biography and career

He was born in County Down, Northern Ireland to his parents Tracy and Danny McClenaghan.

He is coached by Luke Carson.

When he was still technically a junior, he won the bronze medal in the 2016 British Artistic Gymnastics Championships pommel final behind Olympic medalists Louis Smith and Max Whitlock. McClenaghan also won the first European Championships medal in history for Ireland, earning silver on the pommel horse at the 2016 Junior European Gymnastics Championship.

At the 2018 Commonwealth Games held at the Gold Coast, Australia, McClenaghan won gold on the pommel horse, beating the reigning world and Olympic champion Max Whitlock by dint of higher execution score, after tying on overall scores. It was Northern Ireland's first medal for an artistic gymnast at the Commonwealth Games. At the 2018 European Championships, McClenaghan won the gold medal and became Ireland's first-ever European champion.

McClenaghan formerly trained at Rathgael Gymnastics Club in Bangor until his coach was made redundant in June 2018. McClenaghan was forced to train in his back garden. He then relocated to Dublin, upon receiving funding and accommodation from Gymnastics Ireland and Sport Ireland to train in the Sport Ireland Institute in Abbotstown.

In October 2019, he won Ireland’s first World Championship medal, bronze on the pommel horse, making him the most decorated Irish gymnast of all time.

McClenaghan was awarded the British Empire Medal (BEM) in the 2021 New Year Honours for services to gymnastics.

McClenaghan competed in the Tokyo 2020 Olympics, where he came in seventh place in the men's pommel horse final.

In 2022 McClenaghan, along with fellow gymnasts Eamon Montgomery and Ewan McAteer, was banned from competing for Northern Ireland at the 2022 Commonwealth Games by the International Gymnastics Federation (FIG) as he had previously competed internationally for Ireland. The FIG suggested the trio should renounce their Irish nationality on their gymnastics licences, or that the Commonwealth Games Federation remove the relevant event from that summer's Games programme. The decision was met with backlash from politicians including Brandon Lewis, Deirdre Hargey and Leo Varadkar, as well as from Commonwealth Games NI, which accused the FIG of "completely disregarding" the Good Friday Agreement (which gave Northern Irish people the right to be both British and Irish). The trio were ultimately given special dispensation by the FIG allowing them to compete in Birmingham.

References

External links
 
 
 
 

1999 births
Living people
Irish male artistic gymnasts
People from Newtownards
Commonwealth Games gold medallists for Northern Ireland
Commonwealth Games medallists in gymnastics
Gymnasts at the 2018 Commonwealth Games
Gymnasts at the 2022 Commonwealth Games
Recipients of the British Empire Medal
Medalists at the World Artistic Gymnastics Championships
European champions in gymnastics
Gymnasts at the 2020 Summer Olympics
Olympic gymnasts of Ireland
Commonwealth Games silver medallists for Northern Ireland
World champion gymnasts
Medallists at the 2018 Commonwealth Games
Medallists at the 2022 Commonwealth Games